There are bodies of texts that reflect distinct classical narrative in the Indian sub-continent are called the vamsavali (IAST: vaṃśāvalī, Devanagari: वंशावली). They bear special significance in the study of Nepalese history and its historical tradition. In continuation to the itihāsa-purāṇa tradition  as prevalent in the Indian sub-continent, these writings have mostly been referred to, where there is an absence of other historical sources. As a distinct historical narrative, they have a lot to reflect about the past in a broader sense. In Nepal, such chronicles are abundant and historically important, but yet least researched. This sector is yet to be explored fully  and is probable to mirror interesting and near-to-credible (or sometimes highly credible) information about the past.

The vaṃśāvalīs, etymologically, refer only to the list of people of certain vaṃśas (gotra or clan, ancestry in general).

Popular chronicles (vamsavalis) of Nepal 

Alongside the list in the table, in the collection of Hodgson are following vaṃśāvalīs as specified by Hasrat: [The no./vol. refers to the codes in Hodgson collection.]
 No. 27 (19): Bamshavalis, 5 books: Vol. 17. Fol. 1-117; Vol. 52, Fol. 180-1.
 No. 28 (7): Chronology of Nepal, Vol. 17. Fol. 220-27.
 No. 29 (8): Bamsavali, Newari, 2 Vols: Vol. 9, 16, 17 and 19.
 No. 29 (16): Bamsavali, Newari, Vol. 52. Fol. 7-52; Vol. 102, Fol. 9-16.
 No. 29 (1-6): Gorkha Bamsavali, Vol. 51. Fol. 49-1, 92-107; Vol. 55, Fol. 1-4.
 No. 30 (1): Gorkha Bamsavali, Nepali and History of Nepal, Vol. 52, Fol. 57-
 Vol. 74, Fol. 21-23; Vol. 101, Fol. 140-150.
 No. 32 (1): Vamsavali etc. Vols. 50, 54, 56, 93, 95 and 104.
 No. 32 (2): Vamsavali, Vol. 93. Fol. 89 ff; Vol. 101, Fol. 158-167.
 No. 32 (5): Early Gorkha Vamsavalis, Vol. 51. Fol. 111-120.
 No. 33(6): Gorkha Bamsavali, Roll No. 45.
 No. 36 (1): Vamsavali Statistics etc., Vols. 26, 51, 54, 74, 99, 100 and 101.
 No. 37 (5): Vamsavali, Vol. 51, Fol. 181-2.
 No. 39 (6): Nepal Chronology, Vol. 7. Fol. 152-170.
 No. 39 (1): Vamsavalis, Vols. 50 and 55.
Shreṣṭha (2012)  mentions of 101 different vaṃśāvalī manuscripts preserved at National Archives, some of which are named after kings, gods, particular caste groups or places. Following is the list he provides:
 Rājavogamālāvaṃśāvalī
 Mukundasenanṛpavaṃśāvalī
 Makavānapurīyananṛpavaṃśāvalī
 Rājopādhyāyavaṃśāvalī
 Maithilavaṃśāvalī
 Maithilabrāhmaṇavaṃśāvalī
 Macchendravaṃśāvalī
 Nepālavaṃśāvalī
 Nepālarājavaṃśāvalī
 Gorkhāko Vaṃśāvalī
 Rājaguruvaṃśāvalī
 Munasigharānako Vaṃśāvalī
 Rāmaśāhavaṃśāvalī
 Bhāṣā Vaṃśāvalī
 Sūryavaṃśāvalī
 Harivaṃśāvalī
 Śāhavaṃśāvalī
He also gives the main text of another vamsavali, viz. Harsiddhivaṃśāvalī. In the microfilm collections at Nepāl Archives under Nepal-German Manuscript Preservation Project, are also the vamsavalis collection, as published in a catalog (Part 2) under the subjects Itihāsa 1-5 Lagat (pp. 1–41) and Itihas Tādapatra (pp. 42–46), collected with the code, name of the vamsavali, film number, condition, script, number of folios, size, language and others.

References 

Nepal history-related lists
Nepalese chronicles